Van Buren County is the name of four present counties in the United States, which are named for Martin Van Buren.
Van Buren County, Arkansas
Van Buren County, Iowa
Van Buren County, Michigan
Van Buren County, Tennessee
Cass County, Missouri, formerly called Van Buren County